Faithful may refer to:

Film and television
 Faithful (1910 film), an American comedy short directed by D. W. Griffith
 Faithful (1936 film), a British musical drama directed by Paul L. Stein
 Faithful (1996 film), an American crime comedy directed by Paul Mazursky
 The Faithful, a Chinese film of 2018
 "Faithful" (The Handmaid's Tale), a television episode
 "The Faithful" (Law & Order: Criminal Intent), a television episode
 "The Faithful" (Supergirl), a television episode

Music

Albums
 Faithful (Dusty Springfield album), recorded 1971, released 2015
 Faithful (Hi-Five album) or the title song, 1993
 Faithful (Jenn Bostic album) or the title song, 2015
 Faithful (Marcin Wasilewski album), 2011
 Faithful (Todd Rundgren album), 1976
 Faithful, a Hillsong album, 2003

Songs
 "Faithful" (Common song), 2005
 "Faithful" (Go West song), 1992
 "Faithful", by Drake from Views, 2016
 "Faithful", by Julian Lennon from Photograph Smile, 1998
 "Faithful", by Marvin, Welch & Farrar from Marvin, Welch & Farrar, 1971
 "Faithful", by the Original 7ven from Condensate, 2011
 "Faithful", by Ornette Coleman from The Empty Foxhole, 1966
 "Faithful", by Pearl Jam from Yield, 1998
 "Faithful", by Tyga from Kyoto, 2018

Mathematics
 Faithful representation
 Faithful group action
 Faithful module
 Faithful functor

Other uses
 Faithful (baptized Catholic), the collected members baptized into the church
 Faithful (book), a 2004 baseball book by Stephen King and Stewart O'Nan
 Faithfulness, the concept of unfailing loyalty

See also
 Faith (disambiguation)
 Faithfull (disambiguation)
 Faithfully (disambiguation)
 Faithless (disambiguation)
 Old Faithful
 Unfaithful (disambiguation)